Charles Nelson Clevert Jr. (born October 11, 1947)  is a former United States district judge of the United States District Court for the Eastern District of Wisconsin.

Education and career

Born in Richmond, Virginia. Clevert received a Bachelor of Arts degree from Davis and Elkins College in 1969 and a Juris Doctor from Georgetown University Law Center in 1972. He was an assistant district attorney of Milwaukee County, Wisconsin from 1972 to 1975. He was an Assistant United States Attorney of the Eastern District of Wisconsin from 1975 to 1977, and was a Special Assistant United States Attorney for the Northern District of Illinois in 1977.

Clevert was a United States Bankruptcy Judge for the Eastern District of Wisconsin from 1977 to 1995, and was the Chief United States Bankruptcy Judge from 1986 to 1995. He was also a lecturer at the University of Wisconsin Law School from 1989 to 1990.

Federal judicial service

On December 7, 1995, Clevert was nominated by President Bill Clinton to a seat on the United States District Court for the Eastern District of Wisconsin vacated by Terence T. Evans. Clevert was confirmed by the United States Senate on July 17, 1996, and received his commission on July 29, 1996. He was Chief Judge from September 1, 2009, to October 31, 2012. He took senior status on October 31, 2012. He retired from active service on March 31, 2017.

See also 
 List of African-American federal judges
 List of African-American jurists
 List of first minority male lawyers and judges in Wisconsin

References

External links 
 

1947 births
Living people
African-American judges
Assistant United States Attorneys
Davis & Elkins College alumni
Georgetown University Law Center alumni
Judges of the United States District Court for the Eastern District of Wisconsin
Lawyers from Richmond, Virginia
United States district court judges appointed by Bill Clinton
University of Wisconsin Law School faculty
Judges of the United States bankruptcy courts
20th-century American judges
21st-century American judges